The 1986 Supertaça Cândido de Oliveira was the 8th edition of the Supertaça Cândido de Oliveira, the annual Portuguese football season-opening match contested by the winners of the previous season's top league and cup competitions (or cup runner-up in case the league- and cup-winning club is the same). The 1986 Supertaça Cândido de Oliveira was contested over two legs, and opposed Benfica and Porto of the Primeira Liga. Porto qualified for the SuperCup by winning the 1985–86 Primeira Divisão, whilst Benfica qualified for the Supertaça by winning the 1985–86 Taça de Portugal.

The first leg which took place at the Estádio das Antas, saw a 1–1 scoreline. The second leg which took place at the Estádio da Luz saw Porto defeat Benfica 4–2 (5–3 on aggregate), which granted the Dragões a fourth Supertaça.

First leg

Details

Second leg

Details

References

Supertaça Cândido de Oliveira
1986–87 in Portuguese football
FC Porto matches
S.L. Benfica matches